The Portland LumberJax are a lacrosse team based in Portland, Oregon playing in the National Lacrosse League (NLL). The 2007 season was the 2nd in franchise history.

After winning the western division in their inaugural season, the LumberJax suffered through a sophomore slump in 2007. After beginning the season with two straight wins, Portland lost the next ten straight, and scored 10 or more goals in only two of those ten games. They finished the season last in the west with a 4–12 record.

Regular season

Conference standings

Game log
Reference:

Player stats
Reference:

Runners (Top 10)

Note: GP = Games played; G = Goals; A = Assists; Pts = Points; LB = Loose balls; PIM = Penalty minutes

Goaltenders
Note: GP = Games played; MIN = Minutes; W = Wins; L = Losses; GA = Goals against; Sv% = Save percentage; GAA = Goals against average

Awards

Transactions

Trades

Roster
Reference:

See also
2007 NLL season

References

Portland
2007 in sports in Oregon